Flavio dos Santos Dias (born December 16, 1995) is a Cape Verdean footballer who plays as a winger for Austrian 2. Liga club Floridsdorfer AC.

Club career
On 7 September 2020, he returned to Floridsdorfer AC, after having formerly played for the club from 2015 to 2018.

References

External links
 
 

 
1995 births
Living people
Cape Verdean footballers
Floridsdorfer AC players
SV Ried players
SKU Amstetten players
2. Liga (Austria) players
Cape Verdean expatriate footballers
Expatriate footballers in Austria
Cape Verdean expatriate sportspeople in Austria
Association football midfielders